The Ahamidat Alhoarh, also pronounced as "AHamidat El Horah", or "El Hamidat El Horah", is a small town  in the Qena in Southern Egypt.

Their population is around 50k people.  They also have had quite well partnerships with local councils, but only won few seats in the council after the 2011 revolution and all the followed elections. 

El Hamidat El Horah